NXT TakeOver: Brooklyn II was the 11th NXT TakeOver and second TakeOver: Brooklyn professional wrestling livestreaming event produced by WWE. It was held exclusively for wrestlers from the promotion's NXT brand division. The event aired exclusively on the WWE Network and took place on August 20, 2016, at the Barclays Center in Brooklyn, New York as part of that year's SummerSlam weekend.

Eight matches were contested at the event, including two matches taped for future episodes of NXT. In the main event, Shinsuke Nakamura defeated Samoa Joe to capture the NXT Championship. The event is notable for the in-ring debuts of Ember Moon and Bobby Roode. It was also Bayley's last match in NXT before she was moved to the main roster on the Raw brand.

Production

Background
TakeOver was a series of professional wrestling shows that began in May 2014, as WWE's then-developmental league NXT held their second WWE Network-exclusive event, billed as TakeOver. In subsequent months, the "TakeOver" moniker became the brand used by WWE for all of their NXT live specials. In 2015, NXT held an event titled NXT TakeOver: Brooklyn, which took place at the Barclays Center in Brooklyn, New York and was a support show for that year's SummerSlam pay-per-view. A second Brooklyn event, titled Brooklyn II, was scheduled to be held on August 20, 2016, at the same venue and also as a support show for that year's SummerSlam. Brooklyn II was the 11th NXT TakeOver event and in turn established TakeOver: Brooklyn as an annual subseries of TakeOvers that were held at the Barclays Center as support shows for WWE's annual SummerSlam.

Storylines

The card comprised five matches. The matches resulted from scripted storylines, where wrestlers portrayed heroes, villains, or less distinguishable characters that built tension and culminated in a wrestling match or series of matches. Results were predetermined by WWE's writers on the NXT brand, while storylines were produced on their weekly television program, NXT.

On the July 27 episode of NXT, NXT General Manager William Regal named Shinsuke Nakamura the number one contender to face Samoa Joe for the NXT Championship at TakeOver: Brooklyn II. Joe, unhappy with his opponent, first refused to face Nakamura and requested a different opponent but obliged after Regal threatened to strip him of the title.

At TakeOver: Dallas, Asuka defeated Bayley for the NXT Women's Championship by submission when Bayley passed out. On the May 18 episode of NXT, Nia Jax defeated Bayley and kayfabe injured the former. At TakeOver: The End, Jax, who was replacing Bayley, was defeated by Asuka. Bayley returned on the June 22 episode of NXT, where she defeated Deonna Purrazzo. In the following weeks, tensions between Asuka and Bayley escalated before a match was scheduled between the two at TakeOver Brooklyn II. On the August 3 episode of NXT, after Asuka defeated Aliyah, Bayley, who was sitting at ringside after being offered a chair by Asuka, got in the ring after Asuka kept Aliyah in her signature Asuka Lock. On the August 17, 2016 episode of NXT, Asuka and Bayley signed their match contract.

On the August 3 episode of NXT, a vignette aired of Ember Moon's upcoming debut at TakeOver: Brooklyn II. On the August 17 episode of NXT, Billie Kay guilted general manager William Regal into putting her into the match against Ember Moon.

On the August 3 episode of NXT, Bobby Roode made his NXT TV debut. The following week, after Andrade Cien Almas defeated Angelo Dawkins, Roode informed Almas that General Manager William Regal scheduled a match between the two at TakeOver: Brooklyn II.

Event

Preliminary matches
In the first match, No Way Jose faced Austin Aries. Aries forced Jose to submit to the Last Chancery to win the match. After the match, Aries applied the "Last Chancery" on Jose once again until he was interrupted by Hideo Itami. Itami attacked Aries with a  "Go To Sleep" and walked off.

Next, Billie Kay faced Ember Moon. In the end, Moon executed an Eclipse on Kay to win the match.

After that, Bobby Roode faced Andrade Cien Almas. The match ended after Roode performed a "Glorious Bomb" on Almas to win the match.

In the fourth match, The Revival (Scott Dawson and Dash Wilder) defended the NXT Tag Team Championship against Johnny Gargano and Tommaso Ciampa. The match ended after Dawson forced Gargano to submit to an inverted figure-four leglock to retain the title.

In the fifth match, Asuka defended the NXT Women's Championship against Bayley. During the match, Asuka applied the "Asuka Lock" on Bayley but Bayley fought out of the hold. Asuka then performed a spin kick on Bayley to retain the title. After the match, Bayley received a standing ovation from the crowd.

Main event
In the main event, Samoa Joe defended the NXT Championship against Shinsuke Nakamura. During the match, Joe executed a muscle buster on Nakamura for a near-fall. Nakamura performed a "Kinshasa" on Joe for a near-fall. In the climax, Nakamura executed another "Kinshasa" off the middle rope on Joe, followed by a third "Kinshasa" to win the title.

Results

References

External links 
 Official website of WWE NXT

Brooklyn 2
2016 in New York City
2016 WWE Network events
Events in Brooklyn, New York
Professional wrestling in New York City
August 2016 events in the United States